Bob Morane  is a French television series produced by Robert Vernay based on the character of the same name that was created by Henri Vernes. This series was first broadcast on 28 March 1965 on ORTF.

Synopsis 
This series features the adventures of Bob Morane, at the same time journalist, engineer, expert in weapons and martial arts, often with the help of his "sidekick  "Bill Ballantine,  confronting dictatorships, dangerous megalomaniacs and secret societies around the world and, occasionally," The Time ".

Cast
Claude Titre as Bob Morane
Billy Kearns as Bill Ballantine

Episode list

References

External links
 

1965 French television series debuts
1966 French television series endings
1960s French television series
Espionage television series
French science fiction television series
French adventure television series
Television shows based on French novels
Television shows based on comics
Films directed by Robert Vernay
Office de Radiodiffusion Télévision Française original programming
Bob Morane